Afghanotinea is a genus of moths belonging to the family Tineidae. It contains only one species, Afghanotinea klapperichi, which is found in Afghanistan.

References

Tineidae
Monotypic moth genera
Moths of Asia
Tineidae genera